Ceritoturris pupiformis is a species of sea snail, a marine gastropod mollusk in the family Horaiclavidae.

Description
The length of shell attains 4⅓ mm, its diameter 1⅓ mm.

The shell is oblong, narrow and almost pupiform. Its color is white and slightly red at the apex. It contains 8 whorls of which two in the protoconch. The whorls increase but slowly and the last three are of nearly the same width. They are divided at the suture by a fine keel, and a double series of largish and rather acute tubercles surround the middle. The small aperture measures about ⅓ the total length of the shell. The outer lip is thin. The siphonal canal is very short and narrow.

Distribution
This marine species occurs in the Gulf of Oman and in the Persian Gulf
.

References

External links
  Tucker, J.K. 2004 Catalog of recent and fossil turrids (Mollusca: Gastropoda). Zootaxa 682:1–1295.

pupiformis
Gastropods described in 1884